The 1980 Navy Midshipmen football team represented the United States Naval Academy (USNA) as an independent during the 1980 NCAA Division I-A football season. The team was led by eighth-year head coach George Welsh.

Schedule

Personnel

Game summaries

Army

References

Navy
Navy Midshipmen football seasons
Navy Midshipmen football